Turbonilla vatilau is a species of sea snail, a marine gastropod mollusk in the family Pyramidellidae, the pyrams and their allies. The group as a whole is characterized by a narrow, spiraling conical shell, typically a few centimeters in length.

References

External links
 To Encyclopedia of Life
 To World Register of Marine Species

vatilau
Gastropods described in 2010